Idgah railway station is in Idgah colony in the southwest of the city of Agra, Uttar Pradesh, India. Idgah railway station serves around 75,000 passengers every day.

History
The -wide metre-gauge Delhi–Bandikui and Bandikui–Agra lines of Rajputana State Railway were opened in 1874. The Agra–Jaipur line was converted to  broad gauge in 2005.

The broad-gauge Agra–Delhi chord was opened in 1904.

Electrification
The Faridabad–Mathura–Agra section was electrified in 1982–85, Tundla–Yamuna Bridge in 1998–99 and Yamuna Bridge-Agra in 1990–91.

References

External links
Train Arrivals at Idgah Railway Station
Satellite of Idgah Railway Station

Railway stations in Agra
Agra railway division